The Spilopyrinae are a small subfamily of the leaf beetles, or Chrysomelidae. They occur in Australia, New Guinea, New Caledonia and Chile. They were formerly considered a tribe of the subfamily Eumolpinae. The group was elevated to subfamily rank by C. A. M. Reid in 2000. However, some authors have criticised this placement, preferring to retain them within the Eumolpinae.

Genera
 Allsortsia Reid & Beatson, 2010
 Bohumiljania Monrós, 1958
 Cheiloxena Baly, 1860
 Dorymolpus Elgueta, Daccordi & Zoia, 2014
 Hornius Fairmaire, 1885
 Macrolema Baly, 1861
 Richmondia Jacoby, 1898
 Spilopyra Baly, 1860
 Stenomela Erichson, 1847

References

External links
 Australian Faunal Directory – Subfamily Spilopyrinae Chapuis, 1874

Chrysomelidae
Beetle subfamilies
Taxa named by Félicien Chapuis